Uranothauma cuneatum is a butterfly in the family Lycaenidae. It is found in Uganda, southern and western Tanzania, Malawi and eastern Zambia.

The larvae feed on Myrica species.

References

Butterflies described in 1958
Uranothauma